Katalepsy is a Russian death metal band from Moscow. The group formed in 2003, and have released two split albums, one EP, three full-length albums, and one demo. The band's name is a variation of the word "catalepsy", a disorder involving catatonic schizophrenia. Some lyrical themes of the band include gore, violence, splatter, murder and perversions. They are currently signed to Unique Leader Records.
Following the departure of guitarist "Helv" in 2009, no original members remain in the band.

In September 2021, rhythm guitarist Dmitry Dedov died due to HIV.

History

Formation and split album (2003–2004) 
The band was formed in 2003 in Moscow. In 2004 they released a split album with the bands Smersh, Barbarity and Posthumous Blasphemer. The split features 28 songs and length is around 54 minutes in length.

The band released a demo named, Your Fear Is Our Inhabitancy. The release consists of only two songs.

Musick Brings Injuries (2007–2008) 

In 2007, Katalepsy released their first EP entitled Musick Brings Injuries. In 2008, the band released another split album along with an EP in the same year. Both the EP and split album have the same title name; Triumph of Evilution. Musick Brings Injuries was recorded, mixed and mastered in October 2006 at Z-Studio & Navahohut Sound, Zelenograd, Russia except tracks 5 and 6 recorded and mixed in November 2006 at Zvuk l Golos Studio. It was released 23 February 2007. The album was released on iTunes on 25 December 2008.

Track listing

Autopsychosis (2010 – Present) 

In 2013, the band released their debut full-length album, entitled Autopsychosis. The album was released on 8 January 2013 through Unique Leader Records, and through Soulflesh Collector Records on 22 January 2013. The album was made available through iTunes on 8 January 2013. A music video for "Evidence of Near Death (E.N.D.)" was released on 21 September 2012.

Track listing

Members 
Current
Anatoly Shishilov- bass (2005-present)
Andrey Patsionov – drums (2007–2009, 2017-present)
Anton Garasiev – guitar (2008-present)
Igor Filimontsev – vocals (2011-present)

Former
Nikita Siminov – bass (2003–2005)
Ardentis – vocals (2003–2005)
Osip Danko – drums (2003–2006)
Sergey Levochkin – guitar (2003–2007)
Konstantin "Helv" Djatlov – guitar (2003–2009)
Nikita "Cain" Arzhantsev – vocals (2005–2007)
Alexey Semyonov – drums (2006–2007)
Ruslan "Mirus" Iskandaroff – vocals (2007–2011)
Dmitry Dedov- guitar (2010–2021; died)
Evgeny Novikov – drums (2011–2017)

Timeline

Discography 
Studio Albums
 Autopsychosis (Unique Leader Records, 2013)
 Gravenous Hour (Unique Leader Records, 2016)
 Terra Mortuus Est (Unique Leader Records, 2020)

EPs
 Musick Brings Injuries (Soulflesh Collector Records, 2007)
 Triumph of Evilution (Soulflesh Collector Records, 2008)

Splits
 Barbarity / Katalepsy / Smersh / Posthumous Blasphemer (More Hate Productions, 2004)
 Triumph of Evilution (Soulflesh Collector Records, 2008)

Demos
 Your Fear Is Our Inhabitancy (Soulflesh Collector Records, 2010)

References 

Russian death metal musical groups
Musical quartets
Musical groups from Moscow
Musical groups established in 2003
2003 establishments in Russia